Ludvig Hallbäck (born 27 October 2000) is a Swedish handball player who plays for Bjerringbro-Silkeborg Håndbold.

International honours 
Youth European Championship:
Gold Medalist: 2018

Individual awards 
Youth European Championship Top Scorer: 2018

Personal life
He is the son of former Swedish international Jerry Hallbäck.

References
 

  
2000 births
Living people 
Swedish male handball players
21st-century Swedish people